Bill McCabe may refer to:

Bill McCabe (Australian sportsman) (born 1935), North Melbourne footballer and water polo international
Bill McCabe (baseball) (1892–1966), Chicago Cubs and Brooklyn Robins player
Bill McCabe (footballer, born 1908) (1908–1945), Australian rules footballer

See also
 William McCabe (disambiguation)